Abhiraka (Greek: AYBIPAKOY, Brahmi: 𑀅𑀪𑀺𑀭𑀓 Abhiraka), also Aubheraka, Aubhirakes, or formerly  Aghudaka, was an Indo-Scythian king and a member of the Kshaharata dynasty of the Western Satraps circa 30 CE. He was the father of Bhumaka, and the grandfather of Nahapana.

He is known through his coins, which are found in the northern Pakistan area of Chukhsa, and then later in the south, suggesting a southern migration at some point, possibly in search for trade.  His coins have been found in Afghanistan and as far as Arab states of the Persian Gulf. The coinage, reminiscent of the coinage of the Indo-Greeks, has on the obverse a winged Nike with Greek legend "CATRAPATOY CATRAΠOY AYBIPAKOY" ("Abhiraka, Satrap of the Satraps"), and the reverse shows a lion or a horse facing a wheel, with Brahmi or Kharoshthi legend around ''Khaharatasa Khatrapasa Abhirakasa jayatasa Abhirakasa" ("The Khsaharata Satrap Abhiraka, victory to Abhiraka").

"Abhiraka" may also mean "member of the tribe of the Abhiras", and a connection between "Abhiraka" and the tribe of the Abhiras has also been proposed.

Notes

References
 R.C. Senior, "Indo-Scythian coins and history", Volume IV.

1st-century monarchs in Asia
1st-century Iranian people